Alexander Percival Segbefia (born  1963) is a Ghanaian lawyer and politician. He was the Deputy Chief of Staff during Mills government. He was appointed the Minister of Health under the John Dramani Mahama administration.

Career 
Alex Segbefia had his secondary school education at Achimota School. He qualified as a lawyer in the UK and practised law in the UK in various capacities such as Crown Prosecutor, and then eventually becoming the Acting District Crown Prosecutor at the Crown Prosecution Service (CPS).

References 
 

1963 births
National Democratic Congress (Ghana) politicians
Living people
Government ministers of Ghana